Rad (Croatian for proceedings, work) is an academic journal published by the Yugoslav, now Croatian, Academy of Sciences and Arts. It was their only publication from 1867 until 1882, when each of the individual scientific sections of the academy started printing their own journals. , over five hundred issues have been published.

External links
 
 
 

Croatian-language journals
Publications established in 1867
Multidisciplinary academic journals
Academic journals of Croatia
Academic journals published by learned and professional societies